Archibald Campbell K. Currie (born 5 January 1933) is a former New Zealand field hockey player. He represented New Zealand in field hockey at the 1956 Olympic Games in Melbourne.

References

External links

1933 births
Living people
Field hockey players from Christchurch
New Zealand male field hockey players
Olympic field hockey players of New Zealand
Field hockey players at the 1956 Summer Olympics